Oh My Boss ('Mr. Don't Flirt... Oh My Boss!') is a 2021 Thai drama television series starring Worranit Thawornwong (Mook) and Luke Ishikawa Plowden.

Produced by GMMTV in joint partnership with FuKDuK Production, this series is one of 12 television series of GMMTV for 2020 during their "GMMTV 2020: New & Next" event on 15 October 2019.

Cast and characters 
Below are the cast of the series:

Main 
 Worranit Thawornwong (Mook) as Noomnim (La Kha Akitsuki)
 Luke Ishikawa Plowden as Akitsuki Koji (Company Executive Viper X) 
 Kullamas Limpawutivaranon (Knomjean) as Rena 
 Ryota Omi as Hasobe (Company Employee Viper X)

Supporting 
Patara Eksangkul (Foei) as Mark (Major part of the company Viper X)
 Thanaboon Wanlopsirinun (Na) as Minei (Company Employee Viper X)
 Phatchara Thabthong (Kapook) as Phin (Noomnim Friend) 
 Sitang Punpop (Pai) as Ploy (Company Employee Viper X) 
 Phakjira Kanrattanasoot (Nanan) as In (Company Employee Viper X)
 Chinnarat Siriphongchawalit (Mike) as Kamei (Company Employee Viper X)
 Suttatip Wutchaipradit (Ampere) as Gungging (Company Employee Viper X) 
 Thawatchai Phechsuk (Urboy) as Poppy (Noomnim Friend) 
 Darina Bunchu (Nancy) as Meow (Noomnim Friend) 
 Worachai Hiranlab (Top) as Tan (Company Employee Viper X)
 Pranee Meechamnan (Nanan) as Ja Eo’ (Company Employee Viper X) 
 Haruka Yamashita (Harupiii) as Miyakawa Arsuuki (Japanese Model)
 Natpicha Phisadpongchana (Jee) as Ley Kha Mark
 Kradsada Khienjarien (Jao Champ) as Thing (Company Employee Viper X)
 Kazuki Yano as Hasobe’ (President of Kirei (Japan))
 Suumiji Condo as (Hasobe-san's Followers 1)
 Napharit Thaimanee as (Hasobe-san's Followers 2)

Guest role 
 Thitiya Nobpongsakid (Giff) as (Noomnim Mother) (Ep.4,8,9,10,11,12,) 
 Jirakit Thawornwong (Mek) as Nat (Noomnim Brother) (Ep.9,11,12,)
 as Nat (Childhood) (Ep.1,)
 as Noomnim (Childhood) (Ep.1,) 
 as Azube’ (Akitsuki Koji Friend, Phin Couple) (Ep.1,)
 Yanavee Guptavetin (Oil) as (Company Employee Viper X) (Ep.2,)
 Ratprapha Wisuma (Meji) as Baifern (Thai female models) (Ep.5,)
 Lewit Sangsit (Aon) as (Company Employee Viper X Old Customer) (Ep.8) 
 as Mr.Willsan (British businessman) (Ep.10)
 Pattarawan Nanchanok (Mouy) as Kun Su (Department Store Manager) (Ep.10)

Reception

References

External links 
 GMMTV

Television series by GMMTV